The 30th Canadian Parliament was in session from September 30, 1974, until March 26, 1979.  The membership was set by the 1974 election on July 8, 1974, and was only changed somewhat due to resignations and by-elections before it was dissolved prior to the 1979 election.

It was controlled by a Liberal Party majority led by Prime Minister Pierre Trudeau and the 20th Canadian Ministry.  The Official Opposition was the Progressive Conservative Party, led first by Robert Stanfield, and then by Joe Clark.

The sessions were prorogued (reason unknown currently).

The Speaker was James Jerome.  See also the List of Canadian electoral districts 1966-1976 for a list of the ridings in this parliament.

There were four sessions of the 30th Parliament:

Party standings

The party standings as of the election and as of dissolution were as follows:

Members of the House of Commons
Members of the House of Commons in the 30th parliament arranged by province.

Newfoundland

Prince Edward Island

Nova Scotia

* Robert McCleave resigned to become a judge and was replaced by Howard Crosby in a 1978 by-election

New Brunswick

* Robert Fairweather resigned to become Canada's first Human Rights Commissioner and was replaced by Robert Corbett in a 1978 by-election
** Jean-Eudes Dubé resigned and was replaced by Maurice Harquail in a 1975 by-election

Quebec

* Gérard Pelletier left parliament to become ambassador to France he was replaced by Jacques Lavoie on October 14, 1975, after a by-election.  On June 14, 1977 Lavoie quite the PC party and crossed the floor to join the Liberals.
** Jean Marchand left parliament and was replaced by J. Gilles Lamontagne in a May 25, 1977, by-election
*** André-Gilles Fortin was killed in a car accident and was replaced by Richard Janelle in an October 16, 1978, by-election.
† Albanie Morin died in office and was replaced by Dennis Dawson in a May 25, 1977, by-election.
†† Claude Wagner left parliament to accept a seat in the Senate and was replaced by Marcel Ostiguy in an October 16, 1978, by-election
††† Réal Caouette died in office and was replaced by his son Gilles Caouette in a May 24, 1977, by-election
‡ Bryce Mackasey resigned from parliament and was replaced by Pierre Savard in a May 24, 1977, by-election
‡‡ Bud Drury resigned and was replaced by Donald Johnston in an October 16, 1977, by-election.

Ontario

* John Gilbert resigned from parliament in April 1978 to become a judge and was replaced by Bob Rae in an October 16, 1978, by-election.
** Mitchell Sharp retired from politics and was replaced by Rob Parker in an October 16, 1978, by-election.
*** Sean O'Sullivan left parliament to become a priest and was replaced by Geoffrey Scott in an October 16, 1978, by-election.
† John Turner quit parliament in protest of the government's decision to implement wage and price controls he was replaced by Jean Pigott in an October 18, 1976, by-election.
†† Hugh Poulin left parliament in April 1978 to become a judge and was replaced by Robert de Cotret in an October 16, 1978, by-election.
††† Stanley Haidasz left parliament to be appointed to the Senate he was replaced by Yuri Shymko in an October 16, 1978, by-election.
‡ Donald Stovel Macdonald left parliament and was replaced by David Crombie in an October 16, 1978, by-election.
‡‡ Robert Stanbury left parliament and was replaced by William Paul McCrossan in an October 16, 1978, by-election.

Manitoba

* Joseph-Phillippe Guay left parliament and was replaced by Jack Hare in an October 16, 1978, by-election.

Saskatchewan

Alberta

British Columbia

Territories

By-elections

References

Succession

 
Canadian parliaments
1974 establishments in Canada
1979 disestablishments in Canada
1974 in Canadian politics
1975 in Canadian politics
1976 in Canadian politics
1977 in Canadian politics
1978 in Canadian politics
1979 in Canadian politics